"Words as Weapons" is a song by South African rock band Seether. It was released on 1 May 2014, as the lead single from their sixth studio album Isolate and Medicate.

Charts

Weekly charts

Year-end charts

References

Seether songs
2014 singles
2014 songs
Songs written by Shaun Morgan
Songs written by Dale Stewart
Songs written by John Humphrey (drummer)
Song recordings produced by Brendan O'Brien (record producer)